All Things to All Men may refer to:
A phrase from the First Epistle to the Corinthians
"All Things to All Men" (song), 2002 song by The Cinematic Orchestra featuring Roots Manuva
All Things to All Men (film), 2013 British film